Recollection is a compilation album by Leslie Phillips, released in 1987 on Myrrh Records.

Largely a collection of greatest hits from the Myrrh years, this album also contains two new tracks including an acoustic version of "Your Kindness" and the never-before release, "No One But You." Also included are the original demo versions of "Walls of Silence" and "You're the Same." The track "You're The Same" on the digital version of Black and White in a Grey World (1985) has replaced the original recording with the home demo version. The album debuted and peaked at number 40 on the Billboard Top Inspirational Albums chart.

Track listing
All songs written by Sam Phillips, except where noted.

 "Your Kindness" (acoustic recording)  – 3:12
 "No One But You" (new recording)  – 2:36
 "Heart of Hearts" (Mark Heard)  – 3:16
 "Walls Of Silence" (home demo)  – 2:50
 "Libera Me" (Burnett)  – 3:12
 "Love Is Not Lost"  – 4:02
 "Answers Don't Come Easy"  – 4:09
 "You're The Same" (home demo)  – 3:23
 "I'm Finding"  – 3:25
 "When The World Is New"  – 3:39
 "By My Spirit"  – 4:43
 "Strength of My Life"  – 5:35
 "Your Kindness (Reprise)" (acoustic recording)  – 1:16

Production notes
Produced by T Bone Burnett, Jack Joseph Puig and Dan Posthuma.

Charts

Radio singles

References

1987 compilation albums
Sam Phillips (musician) albums
Albums produced by T Bone Burnett
Myrrh Records albums
Word Records albums